Psorosa ochrifasciella is a species of snout moth described by Émile Louis Ragonot in 1887. It is found in Turkey.

References

Moths described in 1887
Phycitini
Endemic fauna of Turkey
Insects of Turkey